On the Edge of Tomorrow is the second album by saxophonist Steve Coleman recorded in 1986 and released on the JMT label.

Reception
The AllMusic review by Scott Yanow states, "Steve Coleman's second recording as a leader introduces his M-Base music in its prime. Essentially creative and avant-garde funk, the performances feature dense but coherent ensembles and crowded grooves... Not for everyone's taste, this frequently exciting set hints at a future that has not yet come".

Track listing
All compositions by Steve Coleman except as indicated
 "Fire Revisited" - 4:48  
 "Fat Lay Back" - 2:12  
 "I'm Going Home" (Kevin Bruce Harris) - 2:58  
 "It Is Time" (Donna Russell, Graham Haynes) - 2:06  
 "(In Order to Perform) A More Perfect Union" - 6:56  
 "Little One I'll Miss You" (Abbey Lincoln, Bunky Green) - 4:33  
 "T-T-Tim" - 1:54  
 "Metaphysical Phunktion" (Kelvyn Bell) - 4:49  
 "Nine to Five" - 1:40  
 "Profile Man" - 2:54 Bonus track on CD
 "Stone Bone (Can't Go Wrong)" - 6:41  
 "Almost There" (Harris) - 2:06  
 "Change the Guard" - 6:01

Personnel
Steve Coleman - alto saxophone, vocals, backing vocals
Graham Haynes - trumpet
Geri Allen - synthesizer
Kelvyn Bell - electric guitar, vocals
Kevin Bruce Harris - electric bass, backing vocals
Mark Johnson - drums, percussion
Marvin "Smitty" Smith - percussion, backing vocals, drums 
Cassandra Wilson - vocals, backing vocals

References 

1986 albums
Steve Coleman albums
JMT Records albums
Winter & Winter Records albums